Knuth is a name of Nordic origin. Knuth may refer to:

As a surname:

Daniel Knuth, American politician, environmentalist, and educator
Donald Knuth, American computer scientist; whence:
 The Art of Computer Programming, often referred to by the author's name
Knuth's Algorithm X
21656 Knuth, Asteroid
Knuth–Morris–Pratt algorithm
Fisher–Yates shuffle, also known as the Knuth Shuffle, an algorithm for randomly permuting sets
Knuth Prize, a prize for outstanding contributions to the foundations of computer science
Knuth reward check
Knuth's up-arrow notation, a method of notation of very large integers
Eigil Knuth, Danish explorer and archaeologist
Frederik Marcus Knuth, Danish taxonomist
Jeff Knuth, Queensland politician
Kate Knuth, American politician
Paul Knuth, German botanist
Reinhard Gustav Paul Knuth, German botanist
Shane Knuth, Queensland politician
Shay Knuth, Playboy'''s Playmate of the Month for September 1969Jason Knuth'', the subject of the dedication of Silver Session for Jason Knuth, a 1998 EP by Sonic Youth

See also 
 Knut (disambiguation).